The Apidima Cave (Spilaio Apidima) is a complex of five caves four small caves located on the western shore of Mani Peninsula in Southern Greece. A systematic investigation of the cave has yielded Neanderthal and Homo sapiens fossils from the Palaeolithic era.

One skull fossil, given the name Apidima 1, shows a mixture of modern human and primitive features and has been dated to be more than 210,000 years old, older than a Neanderthal skull ("Apidima 2") found at the cave, which per some interpretations makes Apidima 1 the oldest proof of Homo sapiens living outside Africa, the second oldest being the maxilla from Misliya cave, Mount Carmel, Israel, with a maximum age of about 190,000 years ago. Apidima 1 is more than 150,000 years older than previous H. sapiens finds in Europe.

Description
The Apidima Cave complex consists of five karstic caves (previously reported as four small caves) formed in the limestone cliffside on the west shore of the Mani Peninsula in southern Greece.

The complex consists of four small caves, designated "A", "B", "C" and "D". The development of the caves is due to the vertical strikes of the limestone, while the horizontal opening is made by the sea.

Archaeology

Research programme
The scientific research programme at Apidima began in 1978 and is being conducted by the National Archaeological Museum of Greece in collaboration with the Laboratory of Historical Geology-Palaeontology of Athens University, the Institute of Geology and Mineral Exploitation and the Aristotle University of Thessaloniki.

Findings
Approximately 20,000 bones, bone fragments, and teeth from various fauna have been collected since 1978 from this site by Theodore Pitsios and his team. There are a few animal specimens with probable traces of butchering.

In addition to fossils, researchers located several tools, including handaxes and tools produced from local flint, along the perimeters of poljes at the Kokkinopilos and Alonaki locations.

Homo fossils

Finding of fossils
Researchers uncovered two significant fossils in Apidima Cave "A" in 1978. The two fossils are now referred to as Apidima 1 and Apidima 2. Stone tools were found in all four caves. Research published in July 2019 indicates that the Apidima 2 skull fragment (designated LAO 1/S2) has Neanderthal morphology, and using uranium-thorium dating, was found to be more than 170,000 years old. The Apidima 1 skull fossil (designated LAO 1/S1) was found to be older, dated—using the same method—to more than 210,000 years old.

As of 1999, Theodore Pitsios, a Professor of Physical Anthropology and Faculty member of Medicine at the National and Kapodistrian University of Athens, estimates that over 30 thousand fossils have been collected from Apidima Cave with the bones of six or more individuals having been found. Of note within these collected fossils are the two crania imbedded in breccia rock in different layers of stratigraphy and were dated to have been deposited during all periods of the Pleistocene era.

In addition to hominid fossils, tools made from both bone and stone were located along with the bones of animals indicative of hunting practices. In addition to these fossils and tools, evidence of fire use was also found.

Apidima I

Apidima I consists of the posterior portion of the cranium which does show signs of erosion. This specimen is suspected of being of similar taxonomic designation as Apidima II though, as of 2019, no testing had been done  Apidima 1 has been found to have more modern features but still presents some older, more primitive features. In a 2019 article written by Katerina Harvati (et.al.) for Nature Journal, it was hypothesized that Apidima 1 may be an early example of Neanderthal prior to the changes in the overall cranial structures, but after the facial features had been developed.  Apidima 1 is estimated to date to more than 200 thousand years ago.

Apidima II

The second crania, labeled Apidima 2 is more representative of Neandertal. A continuous and large brow ridge is present consistent with measurements with Neandertal fossils found elsewhere. It is estimated that Apidima 2 to be dated more than 150 thousand years ago. The fossilized cranium appeared to have multiple fractures, as well as malformation of the left side of the skull, suggestive of sediment pressure which occurred after having been deposited. Apidima 2 has undergone analysis via CT scan in which the cranium was virtually reconstructed. Scientists used the digital nature of this analysis to reconstruct the specimen without fractures and breaks in order to visualize a clearer view of one of the earliest European hominid samples to date.

Homo sapiens hypothesis 
In 2019 study a research team proposed a hypothesis these Hominids present a mixture of modern human and primitive features. This makes Apidima 1 the oldest evidence of Homo sapiens outside Africa, more than 150,000 years older than previous H. sapiens finds in Europe. The lead researcher, Katerina Harvati, summarized, "Our results suggest that at least two groups of people lived in the Middle Pleistocene in what is now southern Greece: an early Homo sapiens population, followed by a Neanderthal population."  Harvati said that the team would attempt to extract ancient DNA from the fossils, but that she was not optimistic about finding any. If sufficient specimens can be obtained, a palaeoproteomic analysis of ancient proteins may also be done on the fossils.

Homo erectus hypothesis 
In 2020 publication another research group concluded that the anatomical features of both skulls show they can be attributed to the group of evolved European Homo erectus hominins, with some early Neanderthal features, similar to the skulls of Sima de los Huesos, Swanscombe, Biache-Saint-Vaast and Lazaret, but they can be differentiated from the classical Neanderthals.

Animal fossil findings 
Fossils of large animals have been found at the Kalamakia site, north of Apidimia. These findings consisted of Rhino, elephant, deer, goat, and sheep species. The deer and caprid species fossils are considered to have been food items.  At Apidimia, Caves B and C held fossils of leopard (Panthera pardus) and European Badger (Meles meles), whereas Caves C and D contained fossils from multiple lynx (Felis (Lynx) lynx). Cave C also provided fossil remains of both wildcat species (Felis silvestris) and red fox (Vulpes vulpes), as well as remains of the beech marten (Martes foina).

See also
 Early human migrations
 List of human evolution fossils
 Misliya cave
 Prehistory of Southeastern Europe

References

External links
Apidima Cave in Mani
Max Planck Institute for Evolutionary Anthropology
Human Timeline (Interactive) – Smithsonian, National Museum of Natural History (August 2016).

Ancient caves of Greece
Ancient Greek archaeological sites in Peloponnese (region)
Archaeological sites in Greece
Caves of Greece
Landforms of Peloponnese (region)
Neanderthal sites
Paleoanthropological sites
Prehistoric Greece